Brymer is the name of:

 Alexander Brymer (1745–1822), Scottish-born Canadian merchant
 Andrea Brymer (born 1972), Scottish television presenter
 Chris Brymer (born 1974), American football player
 Chuck Brymer (born 1959), American businessman and marketing strategist
 Jack Brymer (1915–2003), English clarinettist
 William Brymer (1796–1852), Archdeacon of Bath, England
 William Ernest Brymer (1840–1909), British politician

See also
 The Brymers, American garage rock band